Stephen Foley (born 4 October 1962) is an English former professional footballer who played as a midfielder for Liverpool, Fulham, Grimsby Town, Sheffield United, Swindon Town, Stoke City, Lincoln City and Bradford City.

Career
Foley was born in Liverpool and began his career with local club Liverpool, signing a professional contract in 1980. He never made a first team appearance at Anfield, and spent a loan spell with Fulham, lasting from December 1983 to January 1984, in which he made three league appearances. Foley left Liverpool in the summer of 1984, signing a permanent deal with Grimsby Town. Foley remained at Blundell Park for just one season, making 40 appearances scoring six goals – before signing with Sheffield United. Foley spent two seasons with the Blades making 79 appearances scoring 18 goals before moving to Lou Macari's Swindon Town for a fee of £40,000. Foley spent four-and-a-half years at Swindon making 190 appearances scoring 29 goals before moving to Stoke City in January 1992 for a fee of £50,000 to again work under Macari.

Foley filled in at right back for the remainder of the 1991–92 season which saw him play 26 games helping Stoke reach the play-offs where they lost to Stockport County and he did play in the 1992 Football League Trophy Final which Stoke won 1–0 against Stockport. He played in 54 matches, scoring ten goals in 1992–93 as Stoke won the Football League Division Two title. In 1993–94 Foley again played in 54 matches scoring just twice and was released at the end of the season. He then spent a season at Lincoln City and ended his career at Bradford City.

Career statistics
Source:

A.  The "Other" column constitutes appearances and goals in the Anglo-Italian Cup, Football League play-offs, Football League Trophy.

Honours
Stoke City
 Football League Second Division champions: 1992–93
 Football League Trophy winners: 1992

References

External links
 
 

1962 births
Living people
English footballers
Liverpool F.C. players
Fulham F.C. players
Grimsby Town F.C. players
Sheffield United F.C. players
Swindon Town F.C. players
Stoke City F.C. players
Lincoln City F.C. players
Bradford City A.F.C. players
English Football League players
Association football midfielders